Doll fetishism is a sexual fetish in which an individual is attracted to dolls and doll like objects such as figurines. The attraction may include the desire for actual sexual contact with a doll, a fantasy of a sexual encounter with an animate or inanimate doll, encounters between dolls themselves, or sexual pleasure gained from thoughts of being transformed or transforming another into a doll. Doll fetishism is a form of agalmatophilia, which is itself a form of object sexuality.

As a fantasy

Though not common it can involve intercourse or other sexual activity with dolls.

See also
Agalmatophilia
Sex doll
RealDoll
Robot fetishism
Sexual objectification

References 

Sexual fetishism
Paraphilias